The San Antonio Marriott Riverwalk is a 30-story, 350-feet-tall hotel along the San Antonio River Walk in downtown San Antonio, Texas. Constructed in 1979, it is the city's eighth-tallest building and one of its tallest hotels.

References 
 the San Antonio Marriott Riverwalk

Skyscraper hotels in San Antonio
Hotel buildings completed in 1979